The culture of Ireland includes language, literature, music, art, folklore, cuisine, and sport associated with Ireland and the Irish people. For most of its recorded history, Irish culture has been primarily Gaelic (see Gaelic Ireland). It has also been influenced by Anglo-Norman, English and Scottish culture. The Anglo-Normans invaded Ireland in the 12th century, and the 16th/17th century conquest and colonisation of Ireland saw the emergence of Tudor English culture repurposed in an Irish style. The Plantation of Ulster also introduced Scottish elements mostly confined to Northern Ireland.

Today, there are often notable cultural differences between those of Catholic and Protestant (especially Ulster Protestant) background, and between travellers and the settlers population. Due to large-scale emigration from Ireland, Irish culture has a global reach and festivals such as Saint Patrick's Day and Halloween are celebrated all over the world. Irish culture has to some degree been inherited and modified by the Irish diaspora, which in turn has influenced the home country. Though there are many unique aspects of Irish culture, it shares substantial traits with those of Britain, other English-speaking countries, other predominantly Catholic European countries, and the other Celtic nations.

Farming and rural tradition 

As archaeological evidence from sites such as the Céide Fields in County Mayo and Lough Gur in County Limerick demonstrates, the farm in Ireland is an activity that goes back to the Neolithic, about 6,000 years ago. Before this, the first settlers of the island of Ireland after the last Ice Age were a new wave of cavemen and the Mesolithic period. In historic times, texts such as the Táin Bó Cúailinge show a society in which cows were represented a primary source of wealth and status. Little of this had changed by the time of the Norman invasion of Ireland in the 12th century. Giraldus Cambrensis portrayed a Gaelic society in which cattle farming and transhumance was the norm.

Townlands, villages, parishes and counties 
The Normans replaced traditional clan land management (Brehon Law) with the manorial system of land tenure and social organisation. This led to the imposition of the village, parish and county over the native system of townlands. In general, a parish was a civil and religious unit with a manor, a village and a church at its centre. Each parish incorporated one or more existing townlands into its boundaries. With the gradual extension of English feudalism over the island, the Irish county structure came into existence and was completed in 1610.

These structures are still of vital importance in the daily life of Irish communities. Apart from the religious significance of the parish, most rural postal addresses consist of house and townland names. The village and parish are key focal points around which sporting rivalries and other forms of local identity are built and most people feel a strong sense of loyalty to their native county, a loyalty which also often has its clearest expression on the sports field.

Land ownership and land hunger 

With the Tudor Elizabethan English conquest in the 16th-17th centuries, the Cromwellian conquest of Ireland, and the organized plantations of English Tudor, and later Scottish colonists, the Scottish confined to what's now mostly Northern Ireland, the patterns of land ownership in Ireland were altered greatly. The old order of transhumance and open range cattle breeding died out to be replaced by a structure of great landed estates, small tenant farmers with more or less precarious hold on their leases, and a mass of landless labourers. This situation continued up to the end of the 19th century, when the agitation of the Land League began to bring about land reform. In this process of reform, the former tenants and labourers became land owners, with the great estates being broken up into small- and medium-sized farms and smallholdings. The process continued well into the 20th century with the work of the Irish Land Commission. This contrasted with Britain, where many of the big estates were left intact. One consequence of this is the widely recognised cultural phenomenon of "land hunger" amongst the new class of Irish farmer. In general, this means that farming families will do almost anything to retain land ownership within the family unit, with the greatest ambition possible being the acquisition of additional land. Another is that hillwalkers in Ireland today are more constrained than their counterparts in Britain, as it is more difficult to agree rights of way with so many small farmers involved on a given route, rather than with just one landowner.

Holidays and festivals 

The majority of the Irish calendar today still reflects the old pagan customs, with later Christian traditions also having significant influences. Christmas in Ireland has several local traditions, some in no way connected with Christianity. On 26 December (St. Stephen's Day), there is a custom of "Wrenboys" who call door to door with an arrangement of assorted material (which changes in different localities) to represent a dead wren "caught in the furze", as their rhyme goes.

The national holiday in the Republic of Ireland and Northern Ireland is Saint Patrick's Day, that falls on the date 17 March and is marked by parades and festivals in cities and towns across the island of Ireland, and by the Irish diaspora around the world. The festival is in remembrance of Saint Patrick, one of the patron saints of Ireland. Pious legend credits Patrick with the banishing of the snakes from the island, and the legend also credits Patrick with teaching the Irish about the concept of the Trinity by showing people the shamrock, a 3-leaved clover, using it to highlight the Christian belief of 'three divine persons in the one God'.

In Northern Ireland The Twelfth of July, or Orangemen's Day, commemorates William III's victory at the Battle of the Boyne. A public holiday, it is celebrated Irish Protestants in    particular Ulster Protestants, the vast majority of whom live in Northern Ireland. It is notable for the numerous parades organised by the Orange Order which take place throughout Northern Ireland. These parades are colourful affairs with Orange Banners and sashes on display and include music in the form of traditional songs such as "The Sash" and "Derry's Walls" performed by a mixture of pipe, flute, accordion, and brass marching bands. The Twelfth remains controversial as many in Northern Ireland's large and majority-nationalist Catholic community see the holiday, celebrating a victory over Catholics that ensured the continued establishment of a Protestant Ascendancy, as triumphalist, supremacist, and an assertion of British and Ulster Protestant dominance.

The 1st of February, known as St. Brigid's Day (after St. Brigid, one of the patron saints of Ireland) or Imbolc, also does not have its origins in Christianity, being instead another religious observance superimposed at the beginning of spring. St. Brigid’s Day is the only official public holiday named after a woman in Ireland. The Brigid's cross made from rushes represents a pre-Christian solar wheel.

Other pre-Christian festivals, whose names survive as Irish month names, are Bealtaine (May), Lúnasa (August) and Samhain (November). The last is still widely observed as Halloween which is celebrated all over the world, including in the United States followed by All Saints' Day, another Christian holiday associated with a traditional one. Important church holidays include Easter, and various Marian observances.

Religion 

Christianity in the form of both Roman Catholicism and Protestantism is the most widely practised religion in Ireland. Christianity was brought to Ireland during or prior to the 5th century and its early history among the Irish is in particular associated with Saint Patrick, who is generally considered Ireland's patron saint. The Celtic festival of Samhain, not to be confused with Halloween, originated in Ireland and is now celebrated all over the world.

Ireland is a place where religion and religious practice have always been held in high esteem. The majority of people on the island are Roman Catholics; however, there is a significant minority of Protestants who are mostly concentrated in Northern Ireland, where they make up a plurality of the population. The three main Protestant denominations on the island are the Church of Ireland, the Presbyterian Church in Ireland and the Methodist Church in Ireland. These are also joined by numerous other smaller denominations including Baptists, several American gospel groups and the Salvation Army. As well as these Protestant Churches, other minority denominations include Eastern Orthodox, Jehovah's Witnesses and The Church of Jesus Christ of Latter Day Saints (LDS). In addition to the Christian denominations there are centres for Buddhists, Hindus, Baháʼís, Pagans and for people of the Islamic and Jewish faiths.

In the Republic of Ireland, the last time a census asked people to specify their religion was in 2011. The result was 84.16% Roman Catholic, 2.81% Church of Ireland (Anglican), 1.07% Islam, 0.54% Presbyterian, 0.9% Christian, 0.99% Orthodox, approximately 2.07% other religious groupings and 5.88% identified as having no religion. About 1.59% did not state their religious identity. Amongst the Republic's Roman Catholics, weekly church attendance dropped sharply from 87% in 1981 to 60% in 1998, to 36% in 2016. This remained one of the highest attendance rates in Europe, where the average was 12.8% in 2016. The decline is said to be linked to reports of Catholic Church sexual abuse cases in Ireland.

In Northern Ireland in 2021, the population was 42.3% Roman Catholic, 16.6% Presbyterian, 11.5% Church of Ireland (Anglican), 2.4% Methodist, 6.9% other Christian, 1.6% other religion, 17.4% with no religion and 1.3% religion not stated.

Folklore 

The Leprechaun has been estimated to figure to a large degree in Irish folklore. According to the tales, the leprechaun is a mischievous fairy type creature in emerald green clothing who when not playing tricks spend all their time busily making shoes; the Leprechaun is said to have a pot of gold hidden at the end of the rainbow and if ever captured by a human it has the magical power to grant three wishes in exchange for release. More acknowledged and respected in Ireland are the stories of Fionn mac Cumhaill and his followers, the Fianna, from the Fenian cycle. Legend has it he built the Giant's Causeway as stepping-stones to Scotland; not to get his feet wet, to fight an ugly Scottish giant. He also once scooped up part of Ireland to fling it at a rival, but it missed and landed in the Irish Sea – the clump became the Isle of Man and the pebble became Rockall, the void became Lough Neagh. The Irish king Brian Boru who ended the domination of the so-called High Kingship of Ireland by the Uí Néill, is part of the historical cycle. The Irish princess Iseult is the adulterous lover of Tristan in the Arthurian romance and tragedy Tristan and Iseult. The many legends of ancient Ireland were captured by Lady Gregory in two volumes with forewords by W.B. Yeats. These stories depict the unusual power and status that Celtic women held in ancient times.

Halloween is a traditional and much celebrated holiday in Ireland on the night of 31 October. Supposedly the first evidence of the word halloween is found in a 16th-century Scottish document as a shortening for All-Hallows-Eve, and according to some historians it has its roots in the gaelic festival Samhain, where the Gaels believed the border between this world and the otherworld became thin, and the dead would revisit the mortal world.

In Ireland, traditional Halloween customs include; Guising – children disguised in costume going from door to door requesting food or coins – which became practice by the late 19th century, turnips hollowed-out and carved with faces to make lanterns, holding parties where games such as apple bobbing are played. Other practices in Ireland include lighting bonfires, and having firework displays. Mass transatlantic Irish and Scottish immigration in the 19th century popularised Halloween in North America.

Literature and the arts 

For a comparatively small place, the island of Ireland has made a disproportionately large contribution to world literature in all its branches, in both the Irish and English languages. The island's most widely known literary works are undoubtedly in English. Particularly famous examples of such works are those of James Joyce, Bram Stoker, Jonathan Swift, Oscar Wilde and Ireland's four winners of the Nobel Prize for Literature; William Butler Yeats, George Bernard Shaw, Samuel Beckett and Seamus Heaney. Three of the four Nobel prize winners were born in Dublin (Heaney being the exception, having lived in Dublin but being born in County Londonderry), making it the birthplace of more Nobel literary laureates than any other city in the world. The Irish language has the third oldest literature in Europe (after Greek and Latin), the most significant body of written literature (both ancient and recent) of any Celtic language, as well as a strong oral tradition of legends and poetry. Poetry in Irish represents the oldest vernacular poetry in Europe, with the earliest examples dating from the 6th century.

The early history of Irish visual art is generally considered to begin with early carvings found at sites such as Newgrange and is traced through Bronze Age artefacts, particularly ornamental gold objects, and the Celtic brooches and illuminated manuscripts of the "Insular" Early Medieval period. During the course of the 19th and 20th centuries, a strong indigenous tradition of painting emerged, including such figures as John Butler Yeats, William Orpen, Jack Yeats and Louis le Brocquy.

The Irish tradition of folk music and dance is also widely known, and both were redefined in the 1950s. In the middle years of the 20th century, as Irish society was attempting to modernise, traditional Irish music fell out of favour to some extent, especially in urban areas. Young people at this time tended to look to Britain and, particularly, the United States as models of progress and jazz and rock and roll became extremely popular. During the 1960s, and inspired by the American folk music movement, there was a revival of interest in the Irish tradition. This revival was inspired by groups like The Dubliners, the Clancy Brothers and Sweeney's Men and individuals like Seán Ó Riada. The annual Fleadh Cheoil na hÉireann is the largest festival of Irish music in Ireland.

Before long, groups and musicians like Horslips, Van Morrison and even Thin Lizzy were incorporating elements of traditional music into a rock idiom to form a unique new sound. During the 1970s and 1980s, the distinction between traditional and rock musicians became blurred, with many individuals regularly crossing over between these styles of playing as a matter of course. This trend can be seen more recently in the work of bands like U2, Snow Patrol, The Cranberries, The Undertones and The Corrs.

Languages 

Irish and English are the most widely spoken languages in Ireland. English is the most widely spoken language on the island overall, and Irish is spoken as a first language only by a small minority, primarily, though not exclusively, in the government-defined Gaeltacht regions in the Republic. A larger minority speak Irish as a second language, with 40.6% of people in the Republic of Ireland claiming some ability to speak the language in the 2011 census. Article 8 of the Constitution of Ireland states that Irish is the national and first official language of the Republic of Ireland. English in turn is recognised as the State's second official language. Hiberno-English, the dialect of English spoken in most of the Republic of Ireland, has been greatly influenced by Irish.

In contrast Northern Ireland, like the rest of the United Kingdom, has no official language. English, however, is the de facto official language, and Ulster English is common. In addition, Irish and Ulster Scots have recognition under the European Charter for Regional or Minority Languages, with 8.1% claiming some ability in Ulster Scots and 10.7% in Irish. In addition, the dialect and accent of the people of Northern Ireland is noticeably different from that of the majority in the Republic of Ireland, being influenced by Ulster Scots and Northern Ireland's proximity to Scotland.

Several other languages are spoken on the island, including Shelta, a mixture of Irish, Romani and English, spoken widely by Travellers. Two sign languages have also been developed on the island, Northern Irish Sign Language and Irish Sign Language.

Some other languages have entered Ireland with immigrants – for example, Polish is now the second most widely spoken language in Ireland after English, Irish being the third most commonly spoken language.
 Irish language
 Irish Sign Language
 Hiberno-English
 Ulster Scots dialect
 Mid-Ulster English
 Northern Ireland Sign Language
 Shelta language

Food and drink

Pre-Medieval Ireland 

There are many references to food and drink in early Irish literature. Honey seems to have been widely eaten and used in the making of mead. The old stories also contain many references to banquets, although these may well be greatly exaggerated and provide little insight into everyday diet. There are also many references to fulacht fia, which are archaeological sites commonly believed to have once been used for cooking venison. The fulacht fia have holes or troughs in the ground which can be filled with water. Meat can then be cooked by placing hot stones in the trough until the water boils. Many fulach fia sites have been identified across the island of Ireland, and some of them appear to have been in use up to the 17th century.

Excavations at the Viking settlement in the Wood Quay area of Dublin have produced a significant amount of information on the diet of the inhabitants of the town. The main animals eaten were cattle, sheep and pigs, with pigs being the most common. This popularity extended down to modern times in Ireland. Poultry and wild geese as well as fish and shellfish were also common, as were a wide range of native berries and nuts, especially hazel. The seeds of knotgrass and goosefoot were widely present and may have been used to make a porridge.

Early-modern Ireland 

The Tudor conquest of Ireland led to significant changes in the Irish diet, as it introduced a new agro-alimentary system of intensive grain-based agriculture and led to large areas of land being turned over to grain production. The potato was introduced into Ireland in the second half of the 16th century, as a result of the Columbian exchange, initially as a garden crop; it eventually came to serve as the main food field crop of the tenant and labouring classes, which formed a majority of the population. Ireland also grew large quantities of corned beef, though the vast majority of it was exported. The over-reliance on potatoes as a staple crop in Irish cuisine meant that the people of Ireland were vulnerable to poor potato harvests. The Irish Famine of 1740 was the result of extreme cold weather, but the Great Famine of 1845–1849 was caused by potato blight which spread throughout the Irish crop which consisted largely of a single variety, the Lumper. During the famine, approximately one million people died and a million more emigrated elsewhere.

Modern Ireland 

In the 20th century, the usual modern selection of foods common to Western cultures has been adopted in Ireland. Both US fast food culture and continental European dishes have influenced the country, along with other world dishes introduced in a similar fashion to the rest of the Western world. Common meals include pizza, curry, Chinese food, and lately, some west African dishes have been making an appearance. Supermarket shelves now contain ingredients for, among others, traditional, European, American (Mexican/Tex-Mex), Indian, Polish and Chinese dishes.

The proliferation of fast food has led to increasing public health problems including obesity, and one of the highest rates of heart disease in the world. In Ireland, the Full Irish has been particularly cited as being a major source for a higher incidence of cardiac problems, quoted as being a "heart attack on a plate". All the ingredients are fried, although more recently the trend is to grill as many of the ingredients as possible.

In tandem with these developments, the last quarter of the century saw the emergence of a new Irish cuisine based on traditional ingredients handled in new ways. This cuisine is based on fresh vegetables, fish, especially salmon and trout, oysters and other shellfish, traditional soda bread, the wide range of hand-made cheeses that are now being made across the country, and, of course, the potato. Traditional dishes, such as the Irish stew, Dublin coddle, the Irish breakfast and potato bread, have enjoyed a resurgence. Schools like the Ballymaloe Cookery School have emerged to cater for the associated increased interest in cooking with traditional ingredients.

Pub culture 

Pub culture pervades Irish society, across all cultural divides. The term refers to the Irish habit of frequenting public houses (pubs) or bars. Traditional pub culture is concerned with more than just drinking. Typically pubs are important meeting places, where people can gather and meet their neighbours and friends in a relaxed atmosphere; similar to the café cultures of other countries. Pubs vary widely according to the clientele they serve, and the area they are in. Best known, and loved amongst tourists is the traditional pub, with its traditional Irish music (or "trad music"), tavern-like warmness, and memorabilia filling it. Often such pubs will also serve food, particularly during the day. Many more modern pubs, not necessarily traditional, still emulate these pubs, only perhaps substituting traditional music for a DJ or non-traditional live music.

Many larger pubs in cities eschew such trappings entirely, opting for loud music, and focusing more on the consumption of drinks, which is not a focus of traditional Irish culture. Such venues are popular "pre-clubbing" locations. "Clubbing" has become a popular phenomenon amongst young people in Ireland during the celtic tiger years. Clubs usually vary in terms of the type of music played, and the target audience. Belfast has a unique underground club scene taking place in settings such as churches, zoos, and crematoriums. The underground scene is mainly orchestrated by DJ Christopher McCafferty .

A significant recent change to pub culture in the Republic of Ireland has been the introduction of a smoking ban, in all workplaces, which includes pubs and restaurants. Ireland was the first country in the world to implement such a ban which was introduced on 29 March 2004. A majority of the population support the ban, including a significant percentage of smokers. Nevertheless, the atmosphere in pubs has changed greatly as a result, and debate continues on whether it has boosted or lowered sales, although this is often blamed on the ever-increasing prices, or whether it is a "good thing" or a "bad thing". A similar ban, under the Smoking (Northern Ireland) Order 2006, came into effect in Northern Ireland on 30 April 2007.

National and international organisations have labelled Ireland as having a problem with over-consumption of alcohol. In the late 1980s alcohol consumption accounted for nearly 25% of all hospital admissions. While this figure has been decreasing steadily, as of 2007, approximately 13% of overall hospital admissions were alcohol related. In 2003, Ireland had the second-highest per capita alcohol consumption in the world, just below Luxembourg at 13.5 litres (per person 15 or more years old), according to the OECD Health Data 2009 survey. According to the latest OECD figures, alcohol consumption in Ireland has dropped from 11.5 litres per adult in 2012 to 10.6 litres per adult in 2013. However, research showed that in 2013, 75% of alcohol was consumed as part of a drinking session where the person drank six or more standard units (which equates to three or more pints of beer). This meets the Health Service Executive's definition of binge drinking.

Sport 

Sport on the island of Ireland is popular and widespread. A wide variety of sports are played throughout the island, with the most popular being Gaelic football, hurling, soccer, rugby union, and golf.
Four sports account for over 80% of event attendance. Gaelic football is the most popular sport in Ireland in terms of match attendance and community involvement, and represents 34% of total sports attendances at events in the Republic of Ireland and abroad, followed by hurling at 23%, soccer at 16% and rugby at 8%. and the All-Ireland Football Final is the most watched event in Ireland's sporting calendar.

Swimming, golf, aerobics, soccer, cycling, Gaelic football, and billiards and snooker, are the sporting activities with the highest levels of playing participation. Other sports with material playing populations, including at school level, include tennis, hockey, pitch and putt, basketball, boxing, cricket and squash.

Soccer is the most popular sport involving national teams. The success of the Ireland team at the 1990 FIFA World Cup saw 500,000 fans in Dublin to welcome the team home. The team's song "Put 'Em Under Pressure" topped the Irish charts for 13 weeks.

In Ireland many sports, such as rugby union, Gaelic football and hurling, are organised in an all-island basis, with a single team representing the island of Ireland in international competitions. Other sports, such as soccer, have separate organising bodies in Northern Ireland and the Republic of Ireland. Traditionally, those in the North who identify as Irish, predominantly Catholics and nationalists, support the Republic of Ireland team. At the Olympics, a person from Northern Ireland can choose to represent either the Great Britain team or the Ireland team. Also as Northern Ireland is a Home Nation of the United Kingdom it also sends a Northern Ireland Team to the Commonwealth Games every four years.

 Gaelic Athletic Association
 Northern Ireland national football team
 Republic of Ireland national football team
 Irish Rugby Football Union
 Northern Ireland Commonwealth Games Team
 British Olympic Association
 Olympic Council of Ireland
 Community Games
 Irish Derby Stakes

Media

Print 

In the Republic of Ireland there are several daily newspapers, including the Irish Independent, The Irish Examiner, The Irish Times, The Star, The Evening Herald, Daily Ireland, the Irish Sun, and the Irish language Lá Nua. The best selling of these is the Irish Independent, which is published in both tabloid and broadsheet form. The Irish Times is Ireland's newspaper of record.

The Sunday market is quite saturated with many British publications. The leading Sunday newspaper in terms of circulation is The Sunday Independent. Other popular papers include The Sunday Times, The Sunday Tribune, The Sunday Business Post, Ireland on Sunday and the Sunday World.

In Northern Ireland the three main daily newspapers are The News Letter, which is Unionist in outlook, The Irish News, mainly Nationalist in outlook and the Belfast Telegraph. Also widely available are the Northern Irish versions of the main UK wide daily newspapers and some Scottish dailies such as the Daily Record.

In terms of Sunday papers the Belfast Telegraph is the only one of the three main Northern Irish dailies that has a Sunday publication which is called the Sunday Life. Apart from this all the main UK wide Sunday papers such as The Sun on Sunday are widely available as are some Irish papers such as the Sunday world.

There are quite a large number of local weekly newspapers both North and South, with most counties and large towns having two or more newspapers. Curiously Dublin remains one of the few places in Ireland without a major local paper since the Dublin Evening Mail closed down in the 1960s. In 2004 the Dublin Daily was launched, but failed to attract enough readers to make it viable.

One major criticism of the Republic of Ireland newspaper market is the strong position Independent News & Media has on the market. It controls the Evening Herald, Irish Independent, Sunday Independent, Sunday World and The Star as well as holding a large stake in the cable company Chorus, and indirectly controlling The Sunday Tribune. The Independent titles are perceived by many Irish republicans as having a pro-British stance. In parallel to this, the Independent titles are perceived by many opposition supporters as being pro Fianna Fáil.

The Irish magazine market is one of the world's most competitive, with hundreds of international magazines available in Ireland, ranging from Time and The Economist to Hello! and Reader's Digest. This means that domestic titles find it very hard to retain readership. Among the best-selling Irish magazines are the RTÉ Guide, Ireland's Eye, Irish Tatler, VIP, Phoenix and In Dublin.

Radio 
The first known radio transmission in Ireland was a call to arms made from the General Post Office in O'Connell Street during the Easter Rising. The first official radio station on the island was 2BE Belfast, which began broadcasting in 1924. This was followed in 1926 by 2RN Dublin and 6CK Cork in 1927. 2BE Belfast later became BBC Radio Ulster and 2RN Dublin became RTÉ. The first commercial radio station in the Republic, Century Radio, came on air in 1989.

During the 1990s and particularly the early 2000s, dozens of local radio stations have gained licences. This has resulted in a fragmentation of the radio broadcast market. This trend is most noticeable in Dublin where there are now 6 private licensed stations in operation.

Television 

Different television stations are available depending on location in Northern Ireland or the Republic of Ireland. In Northern Ireland the main terrestrial television stations are the main UK wide channels BBC One, BBC Two, ITV, Channel 4 and Channel 5. Both the BBC and ITV have local regional programing specific to Northern Ireland produced and broadcast through BBC Northern Ireland and UTV.

In terms of Satellite-carried channels in Northern Ireland these are the same as for the rest of the United Kingdom including all Sky channels.

In the Republic of Ireland some areas first received signal from BBC Wales and then latter from BBC Northern Ireland when it began broadcasting television programmes in 1959 before RTÉ Television opened in 1961. Today the Republic's main terrestrial channels are RTÉ One, RTÉ Two, TV3 which began broadcasting in 1998 and Teilifís na Gaeilge (TnaG), now called TG4 which started its Irish language service in 1996.

British and satellite-carried international television channels have widespread audiences in the Republic. The BBC and ITV families of channels are available free to air across the Republic and there is widespread availability of the four main UK channels (BBC1, BBC2, ITV1 and Channel Four) but only limited coverage from Five. Sky One, E4, and several hundred satellite channels are widely available. Parts of the Republic can access the UK digital TV system Freeview.

Film 

The Republic of Ireland Film industry has grown rapidly in recent years thanks largely to the promotion of the sector by Bord Scannán na hÉireann (The Irish Film Board) and the introduction of generous tax breaks. Some of the most successful Irish films included Intermission (2001), Man About Dog (2004), Michael Collins (1996), Angela's Ashes (1999), My Left Foot (1989), The Crying Game (1992), In the Name of the Father (1994) and The Commitments (1991). The most successful Irish film directors are Kenneth Branagh, Martin McDonagh, Neil Jordan, John Carney, and Jim Sheridan. Irish actors include Richard Harris, Peter O'Toole, Maureen O'Hara, Brenda Fricker, Michael Gambon, Colm Meaney, Gabriel Byrne, Pierce Brosnan, Liam Neeson, Daniel Day-Lewis, Ciarán Hinds, James Nesbitt, Cillian Murphy, Jonathan Rhys Meyers, Saoirse Ronan, Brendan Gleeson, Domhnall Gleeson, Michael Fassbender, Ruth Negga, Jamie Dornan and Colin Farrell.

Ireland has also proved a popular location for shooting films with The Quiet Man (1952), Saving Private Ryan (1998), Braveheart (1995), King Arthur (2004) and P.S. I Love You (2007) all being shot in Ireland.

Cultural institutions, organisations and events 

Ireland is well supplied with museums and art galleries and offers, especially during the summer months, a wide range of cultural events. These range from arts festivals to farming events. The most popular of these are the annual Dublin Saint Patrick's Day Festival which attracts on average 500,000 people and the National Ploughing Championships with an attendance in the region of 400,000. There are also a number of Summer Schools on topics from traditional music to literature and the arts.

Major organisations responsible for funding and promoting Irish culture are:

 Arts Council of Ireland
 Arts Council of Northern Ireland
 Culture Ireland
 Department of Tourism, Culture, Arts, Gaeltacht, Sport and Media (Republic of Ireland)
 Department for Communities (Northern Ireland)
 Foras na Gaeilge

List of institutions and organisations

 Abbey Theatre
 Acadamh na hOllscolaíochta Gaeilge
 Ambassador Theatre
 Aosdána
 Arts Council of Ireland
 Art Projects Network
 Chester Beatty Library
 Comhaltas Ceoltóirí Éireann
 Conradh na Gaeilge
 Cork Opera House
 Crawford Art Gallery
 Culture Ireland
 Druid Theatre, Galway
 Dublin Writers Museum
 Gael Linn
 Gaelchultúr
 Gaelic Athletic Association
 Gate Theatre
 Glór na nGael
 Chun Bliain Taitneamhach a Fheiceáil
 Grand Opera House, Belfast
 Hugh Lane Municipal Gallery, Dublin
 Heritage Council
 Irish Architecture Foundation
 Irish Georgian Society
 Ireland Literature Exchange (ILE)
 Irish Museum of Modern Art at the Royal Hospital Kilmainham
 Irish Museums Association
 James Joyce Centre
 Lime Tree Theatre, Limerick
 Macnas, performance arts company, Galway
 National Archives of Ireland
 National Concert Hall
 National Folklore Collection UCD
 National Gallery of Ireland
 National Library of Ireland
 National Museums Northern Ireland
 National Museum of Ireland
 National Photographic Archive
 National Transport Museum of Ireland
 National Wax Museum
 Northern Ireland Screen
 National Trust (UK)
 Office of Public Works
 Poetry Ireland
 Royal Dublin Society (RDS)
 Royal Irish Academy
 Royal Irish Academy of Music
 Royal Society of Antiquaries of Ireland
 Royal Ulster Academy of Arts
 SFX City Theatre
 State Heraldic Museum
 Taibhdhearc na Gaillimhe, Irish language theatre, Galway
 Temple Bar Cultural Trust
 The Helix, performing arts centre, Dublin
 The Hunt Museum, Limerick
 The Point Theatre
 Ulster American Folk Park, Omagh
 Ulster Folk and Transport Museum, Co. Down
 Ulster Museum, Belfast
 University Concert Hall, Limerick

Events

 All-Ireland Senior Football Championship
 All-Ireland Senior Hurling Championship
 Bealtaine
 Bloomsday
 Bray Jazz Festival
 Kilkenny Cat Laughs Comedy Festival
 City of Derry Jazz and Big Band Festival
 Clifden Arts Festival
 Cork Jazz Festival
 Culture Night
 Dublin Theatre Festival
 Earagail Arts Festival
 Féile na Gealaí
 Fleadh Cheoil
 Galway Arts Festival
 Imbolg
 Liú Lúnasa
 Lúnasa
 National Ploughing Championships
 Oireachtas na Gaeilge
 Pan Celtic Festival
 Puck Fair, Killorglin
 Saint Patrick's Day
 Samhain
 Scoil Acla
 Seachtain na Gaeilge
 St. Patrick's Festival and Skyfest
 Swell Music and Arts Festival
 The Twelfth
 Maiden City Festival
 Harvest Time Blues
 Heritage Week

See also 

 List of Ireland-related topics
 Architecture of Ireland
 Culture of Gaelic Ireland
 Culture of Northern Ireland
 Gaelic Revival
 Irish name
 Heritage sites (Ireland)
 Bataireacht – An ancient Irish martial arts that uses a Shillelagh
 Fidchell – An ancient Irish board game similar to chess
Gaelic culture
Clothing of Ireland

References

External links 

BBC Northern Ireland Television & Radio Archive
Central Statistics Office Ireland
Irish Department of Foreign Affairs: Facts about Ireland
Irish Broadcasting
Population figures by religion
Pobal Eolas Ilmheáin Gaeilge – PEIG.ie
Acadamh na hOllscolaíochta Gaeilge provides a diploma course in indigenous Irish culture